Afrocantharellus fistulosus is a species of fungus in the family Cantharellaceae. First described in 2008 as a species of Cantharellus, it was transferred to the new genus Afrocantharellus in 2012.

References

External links

Cantharellaceae
Fungi described in 2008
Fungi of Africa